The 2013 Grand Prix of Maykop was a one-day women's cycle race held in Russia on June 4 2013. The tour has an UCI rating of 1.2. The race was won by the Russian, Natalia Boyarskaya.

References

Grand Prix of Maykop
Grand Prix of Maykop
Grand Prix of Maykop